HLQ may refer to:

 Huntington Library Quarterly, an official publication of the Huntington Library
 HLQ, the ICAO code for Harlequin Air, a defunct airline in Fukuoka, Japan